On Revolution is a 1963 book by political theorist Hannah Arendt. Arendt presents a comparison of two of the main revolutions of the eighteenth century, the American and French Revolutions.

History 

Twelve years after the publication of her The Origins of Totalitarianism (1951), looking at what she considered failed revolutions, Arendt optimistically turned her attention to predict nonviolent movements that would restore democratic governments around the world. Her predictions turned out to be largely true, these revolutions being largely, though unconsciously, based on the principles she laid out.

Overview

In On Revolution Arendt argues that the French Revolution, while well studied and often emulated, was a disaster and that the largely ignored American Revolution was a success, an argument that runs counter to common Marxist and leftist views. The turning point in the French Revolution came when the revolution's leaders abandoned their goal of freedom in order to focus on compassion for the masses. In America, on the other hand, the Founding Fathers never betrayed the goal of Constitutio Libertatisthe attempt to establish a public realm, where political freedom would be guaranteed for all. Yet Arendt believes the revolutionary spirit of those men was later lost, and advocates a "council system" as an appropriate institution to regain it.

In an earlier book, The Human Condition, Arendt argued that there were three states of human activity: labor, work, and action.  "Labor" is, essentially, a state of subsistence—i.e., doing what it takes to stay alive.  For Arendt, this was the lowest form of human activity (all living creatures are capable of this). "Work" is the process of creating—a painter may create a great work of art, a writer may create a great work of fiction, etc. For Arendt, "working" is a worthwhile endeavor. Through your works, people may remember you; and if your work is great enough, you may be remembered for thousands of years. Arendt notes that people still read the Iliad, and Homer will be remembered for as long as people keep telling his stories.  However, Arendt argues the Iliad is only still read because of its protagonist: Achilles. For Arendt, Achilles embodies "action." Only by interacting with others in some sort of public forum can your legacy be passed down through the generations; only by doing something truly memorable can a person achieve immortality.

Arendt believed that the leaders of the American Revolution were true "actors" (in the Arendtian sense), and that their Constitution created "publics" that were conducive to action.  The leaders of the French Revolution, on the other hand, were too focused on subsistence (what Arendt called their "demands for bread"), as opposed to "action." For a revolution to be truly successful, it must allow for—if not demand—that these publics be created. The leaders of the American Revolution created "a public" and acted within that space; their names will be remembered. The leaders of the French Revolution got their bread; their names have been forgotten.

Criticism 
Critics of On Revolution include Eric Hobsbawm, who argued that Arendt's approach was selective, both in terms of cases and the evidence drawn from them. For example, he claimed that Arendt unjustifiably excludes revolutions that did not occur in the West, such as the Chinese Revolution of 1911, and that her description of the Russian Revolution is a mischaracterization. Because of this, Hobsbawm finds the link between Arendtian revolutions and history to be "as incidental as that of medieval theologians and astronomers". Moreover, he finds further fault with how normative Arendt's conception of revolution is, describing its basis as "explicit old-fashioned philosophical idealism".

Bibliography 
 , (see also The Origins of Totalitarianism and Comparison of Nazism and Stalinism) Full text (1979 edition) on Internet Archive (no longer available) 
   Full text on Internet Archive
 , in

References 

1963 non-fiction books
Books by Hannah Arendt
Books in political philosophy
Contemporary philosophical literature
Political books
Political philosophy
Viking Press books